Microberlinia is a genus of plants in the family Fabaceae (legume family). It includes two species of tree native to Cameroon and Gabon in West Africa. The common name is zingana or zebrawood.

References
 Mabberley, D. J. (1987). The Plant Book: A Portable Dictionary of the Higher Plants. Cambridge: Cambridge University Press. .

Detarioideae
Fabaceae genera
Trees of Africa
Taxa named by Auguste Chevalier